William Brookes was an Australian politician.

He migrated to Australia around 1854 and settled near Newcastle. Although he was referred to as "Dr Brookes", he was not practising medicine at this time. In 1869 he was elected to the New South Wales Legislative Assembly for Northumberland, serving until his defeat in 1872.

References

 

Year of birth missing
Year of death missing
Members of the New South Wales Legislative Assembly